Officially known as Le Club de Hockey Canadien, the Montreal Canadiens are a Canadian professional ice hockey team based in Montreal, Quebec. They play in the Atlantic Division of the Eastern Conference in the National Hockey League (NHL). In 1909, the Canadiens were founded as a charter member of the National Hockey Association (NHA). In 1917, the franchise joined the NHL, and is one of the Original Six teams. In their 100-year history, the Canadiens have won 24 Stanley Cup championships, and are the last Canadian team to have won the Stanley Cup, having done so in 1993. Having played in the Jubilee Arena (1909–1910,1918–1919), the Montreal Arena (1911–1918), the Mount Royal Arena (1919–1926), and the Montreal Forum (1926–1996), the Canadiens have played their home games at the Bell Centre, formerly known as the Molson Centre, since 1996. The team has had eighteen general managers since their inception.

Key

General managers

See also
List of current NHL general managers

Notes
 A running total of the number of general managers of the franchise. Thus any general manager who has two or more separate terms as general manager is only counted once.

References

Montreal Canadiens
 
Montreal Canadiens general managers
General managers